The Fresh Beat Band is an American preschool television series created by Scott Kraft and Nadine van der Velde. The series premiered on Nickelodeon in the United States on August 24, 2009, and aired episodes on Nickelodeon and  Nick Jr. through December 7, 2013. The series ran for three seasons of 60 episodes and one concert special.

Series overview

Episodes

Season 1 (2009–10)
 This is the only season to feature Hadley Fraser as Reed.

Season 2 (2010–11)
 Patrick Levis replaces Hadley Fraser as Reed.
 This is the last season to feature Shayna Rose as Marina.

Season 3 (2011–13)
 New character "Harper" is introduced – he runs the Singing Pizza Cafe.
 The Fresh Beats graduate from music school.
 This season marks the debut of Tara Perry (who replaced Shayna Rose) as Marina.

Concert Special (2013)

References

External links
 

Lists of American children's television series episodes
Lists of Nickelodeon television series episodes